Amrit Velā 
(pronunciation: , lit: never ending time) Does not refer to a specific time This is according to the Pahar system of time most Sikhs typically translate this time to start 3:00am. Guru Nanak in the Japji Sahib (4th Pauri) says, "In amrit velā meditate on the grandeur of the one true Name." The importance of Amrit Vela is found throughout the Guru Granth Sahib. The Guru Granth Sahib states that "those who consider themselves a Sikh must wake up daily at Amrit vela and be in tune with the Naam (the Lord's Name)"

In the SPGC Sikh Rehat Maryada it is written to arise in the Amrit Velā, bath, and meditate on the divine Naam (through Simran and Naam Japna). Here, Amrit Vela is defined as "three hours before the dawn". Sikhs recite their morning Nitnem during Amrit vela. Traditionally after Nitnem Sikhs meet with the Sangat (congregation) to recite Asa di Var.

See also 
 Amrit
 Khalsa
 Meditation
 Nitnem
 Outline of Sikhism
 Sikh beliefs
 Sikhism
 Simran

References

Further reading 
 Singh, Puran (1929). The Spirit Born People. Peshawar: Languages Department, Punjab.
 Singh, Raghbir (2001). Bandginama. (English Translation) New Delhi: Atma Science Trust

External links 
 Definition of Amrit Vela
 Amritvela Cheat Sheet
 Q&A - Amrit Vela and Sadh Sangat #7 @ UCL Sikh Society Video
 Amrit Vela - Importance - Guru's Hukam (Gurbani Lines) Video
 Amrit Vela: Rise & Shine

Sikhism
Meditation
Time in religion